Harue Kitamura ( 11 July 1928 – 13 March 2022) was a Japanese politician, lawyer, and feminist. She is the first woman to be elected mayor of a Japanese city, serving three terms as the mayor of Ashiya, Hyogo.

Early life 
Kitamura was born in Kyoto in 1928. Raised in Osaka, in 1952 she graduated from Ritsumeikan University's law department. After experiencing gender discrimination in the workplace, Kitamura decided to become a lawyer to improve conditions and reduce inequality. She became the first Ritsumeikan alumna to pass the bar exam in 1956.

Career 
In 1959, Kitamura started working at the Osaka Family Court, then from 1979 until 1991, at the Ashiya Education Commission to chair terms.

Kitamura ran for mayor of Ashiya in 1991 as an independent, and became the first female mayor of a Japanese city. Her main supporters were mothers who supported her plans for public school reform. In 1992 Kitamura was presented with a Medal of Honor.

The Great Hanshin Earthquake occurred during her time in office, and 400 of Ashiya's citizens were killed. With transportation and official communications lines down, Kitamura had to call the mayors of Osaka, Beppu, and Izumo personally to ask for aid. Refugees stayed in city hall for weeks until housing was built.

In 2003 Kitamura retired from political life, and chose not to run for re-election. She was publicly recognized by the governor of Hyogo prefecture, Toshizō Ido, for her work. Kitamura was awarded the Order of the Rising Sun,  in 2004.

Personal life and death 
Kitamura died from aspiration pneumonia in Nishinomiya on 13 March 2022, at the age of 93.

Publications 
  chapter title: 
  chapter title: 
  chapter title:

References 

1928 births
2022 deaths
People from Kyoto
Ritsumeikan University alumni
Women mayors of places in Japan
Japanese women lawyers
Japanese feminists
Recipients of the Order of the Rising Sun
Recipients of the Medal with Blue Ribbon
Deaths from pneumonia in Japan
20th-century Japanese lawyers